Phantom Space Corporation is an American space transportation and rocket manufacturing startup based in Tucson, Arizona and founded by Jim Cantrell and Michael D'Angelo. 

The company is building a two-stage rocket called Daytona. As designed, the vehicle will be 18.7 meters tall, 1.5 meters in diameter. It will be able to loft 450 kilograms to low Earth orbit, 160 kg to GTO, or 50 kg to the Moon for a claimed launch price of $4 million. It will use nine Hadley engines produced by Ursa Major Technologies on its first stage, and one Hadley Vacuum engine on its second stage. The first launch is projected to take place in 2023.

The company is also working on a larger two-stage rocket called Laguna. It will be 20.5 meters high and 2 meters in diameter and will be able to launch 1,200 kilograms to low Earth orbit, 425 kg to GTO, 200 kg to the Moon or 100 kg to Mars. The first stage will be powered by three of Ursa Major's larger Ripley engines and the second stage will again feature a single Hadley Vacuum engine with a launch price of $8 million. Phantom Space claims they intend to propulsively land the Laguna first stage in much the same way as SpaceX lands Falcon 9, utilizing hydraulic-actuated aerodynamic surfaces and foldout landing legs.

In April 2021, the company raised $5 million in seed investment funding.

In May 2021, it acquired StratSpace, a satellite program designer and manager Cantrell founded in 2000. The acquisition made Phantom Space the first 100% U.S.-based satellite supply chain in its effort to mass produce rockets on a large scale.

In August 2021, the company acquired space systems developer Micro Aerospace Solutions (MAS) operating out of Melbourne, Florida.

References

External links 
 Official Website

Aerospace companies of the United States
Private spaceflight companies
Companies based in Tucson, Arizona